The Birthplace of Seattle Monument is a granite obelisk on Seattle's Alki Point, in the U.S. state of Washington. Erected in 1905, the monument marks the site where the Denny Party landed in 1851.

References

External links 

 

1905 establishments in Washington (state)
1905 sculptures
Granite sculptures in Washington (state)
Monuments and memorials in Seattle
Obelisks in the United States
Outdoor sculptures in Seattle
West Seattle, Seattle